The Duomo of San Giorgio (i.e. "Dome of St. George") is a Baroque church located in Ragusa Ibla, Sicily, Italy.

Its construction began in 1738 and ended in 1775.

The cathedral appears in the opening credits of the Italian TV series Inspector Montalbano, and it also features in some episodes, as does the similarly named cathedral of Modica.

See also 
 Catholic Church in Italy

References

External links 

Roman Catholic churches in Ragusa
Roman Catholic churches completed in 1775
Baroque architecture in Ragusa
18th-century Roman Catholic church buildings in Italy